The 1987 Libyan Premier League was the 20th edition of the competition since its inception in 1963. The league consisted of 18 teams, who played each other just once. The first round of matches were played on March 20, 1987, and the final round of games were played on August 28, 1987. Benghazi club Nasr won their first title (and to date, their only one) by one point, from Madina.

League standings

References
Libya - List of final tables (RSSSF)

Libyan Premier League seasons
Premier League
Libya
Libya